Pablo Gállego Lardiés (born 1 October 1993) is a professional footballer who currently plays as a right winger for Hong Kong Premier League club Resources Capital. Born in Spain, he represents the Nicaragua national team.

Club career

Youth career 
Gállego began his career in the youth academies of Siglo XXI and Peñas Oscenses, before transferring to the youth setup of Real Zaragoza. After spending two years at Zaragoza, Gállego moved on and signed for Huesca in 2010.

Huesca 
In 2012, after spending two years in the team's youth academy, he gave his professional debut for their second team, Almudévar, where after a great first season his duties where also required in the first team. He gave his debut for Huesca in the Segunda División B,  against Las Palmas Atlético in the 2013–14 season.

Sariñena 
In January 2014, he left Huesca after three years, signing for Sariñena, where he continued gaining experience in the Segunda División B.

Cacereño 
Staying for only 6 months, Gállego continued his career at Cacereño, staying for two seasons. In his second season with the team, Gállego showcased his abilities scoring seven goals in 27 league matches. He made a total of 61 games for the club.

Lealtad 
In June 2017, Gállego signed for Lealtad, but again only spent 6 months with the team, as his transfer to Greek Superleague team AEL got announced on 20 December 2016.

AEL 
On 4 January 2017, he made his official debut for AEL against Veria, scoring in his debut and being named man of the match. However, after 6 months he just managed to make five more appearances for AEL and was released at the end of the season.

Real Estelí 
After his spell in Greece, he left Europe and signed for Nicaraguan side Real Estelí. In his 6 months with the club, Gállego managed to make a great impact and caught the eye of European clubs.

Kastrioti 
On 31 August 2018, he returned to Europe signing for Albanian team Kastrioti. Not being able to showcase his talent and abilities for his new team, he was released on 7 November 2018 after just appearing in some league matches, one cup game and scoring one goal.

Teruel 
On 2 January 2019, his return to Spain got announced, where he signed for Segunda División B club Teruel.

Managua 
After fulfilling his 6-month contract with Teruel, Gállego returned to Nicaragua signing for Managua in the Liga Primera de Nicaragua. On 12 December 2019, Managua won the Copa de Nicaragua, after beating Diriangén 4–3 in penalties. Gállego played a major role in the teams achievement in finishing runner-up in both the Apertura 2019 and in the Clausura 2020. Managua also managed to reach the final of the Copa de Nicaragua in 2020, however was unable to defend its title, losing 0–1 to Diriangén.

Zemplín Michalovce 
On 30 July 2021, Gállego returned to Europe and signed with Slovak club Zemplín Michalovce in the Fortuna liga.

Pierikos 
After only staying in Slovakia for 5 months, Gállego returned to Greece by singing with Super League 2 club Pierikos.

Þróttur Vogum 
On 21 April 2022, Gállego joined Icelandic second division club Þróttur Vogum.

Real Estelí 
After unsuccessfully trying to find his luck in Europe, Gállego returned to Nicaragua and signed for his former club Real Estelí on 8 July 2022.

Resources Capital 
On 13 January 2023, Gállego joined Resources Capital.

International career 
After spending enough time in Nicaragua, Gállego gained citizenship and thus became eligible to play for the national team. On 9 March 2021, national team manager Juan Vita included Gállego into the Nicaragua squad. On 2 February 2022, he scored in his debut in a friendly match against Belize.

Career statistics

Club

International

International goals 
Scores and results list Nicaragua's goal tally first.

Honours 
Managua

Copa Nicaragua: 2019; runners-up: 2020
Liga Primera de Nicaragua runners-up: Apertura 2019, Clausura 2020, Clausura 2021
Real Estelí

 Liga Primera de Nicaragua: Apertura 2022; runners-up: Clausura 2018

References

External links

1993 births
Living people
People from Huesca
Sportspeople from the Province of Huesca
Footballers from Aragon
Nicaraguan men's footballers
Nicaragua international footballers
Spanish footballers
Spanish emigrants to Nicaragua
Nicaraguan people of Spanish descent
Spanish expatriate footballers
Nicaraguan expatriate footballers
Association football wingers
AD Almudévar players
SD Huesca footballers
CP Cacereño players
CD Lealtad players
Athlitiki Enosi Larissa F.C. players
Real Estelí F.C. players
KS Kastrioti players
CD Teruel footballers
Managua F.C. players
MFK Zemplín Michalovce players
Pierikos F.C. players
Þróttur Vogum players
Resources Capital FC players
Tercera División players
Segunda División B players
Super League Greece players
Nicaraguan Primera División players
Kategoria Superiore players
Slovak Super Liga players
1. deild karla players
Super League Greece 2 players
Hong Kong Premier League players
Expatriate footballers in Greece
Spanish expatriate sportspeople in Greece
Nicaraguan expatriate sportspeople in Greece
Expatriate footballers in Nicaragua
Spanish expatriate sportspeople in Nicaragua
Expatriate footballers in Albania
Spanish expatriate sportspeople in Albania
Expatriate footballers in Slovakia
Nicaraguan expatriate sportspeople in Slovakia
Expatriate footballers in Iceland
Nicaraguan expatriate sportspeople in Iceland
Expatriate footballers in Hong Kong